Filipe Manuel Esteves Ramos (born 21 April 1970 in Luanda, Portuguese Angola), known simply as Filipe, is a Portuguese retired footballer who played as a midfielder, currently a manager.

External links

1970 births
Living people
Footballers from Luanda
Portuguese footballers
Association football midfielders
Primeira Liga players
Liga Portugal 2 players
Segunda Divisão players
S.C.U. Torreense players
Sporting CP footballers
C.S. Marítimo players
Vitória S.C. players
G.D. Chaves players
Associação Naval 1º de Maio players
Atlético Clube de Portugal players
C.D. Mafra players
Portugal youth international footballers
Portugal under-21 international footballers
Portugal international footballers
Portuguese football managers